"Robin Redbreast" is the first episode of first season of the British BBC anthology TV series Play for Today. The episode was a television play that was originally broadcast on 10 December 1970. "Robin Redbreast" was written by John Griffith Bowen, directed by James MacTaggart and produced by Graeme MacDonald. 

The play is about pagan rural customs and their interaction with modern society.

Synopsis 

After she's dumped by her boyfriend, BBC script editor Norah Palmer (Anna Cropper) leaves her friends Jake (Julian Holloway) and Madge (Amanda Walker) in London and moves to the house that she'd bought with her boyfriend in the countryside in Southern England. Norah finds the  village people strange but endearing, notably Mrs. Vigo (Freda Bamford), a busybody housekeeper; Mr. Fisher (Bernard Hepton), a historian; Mr. Wellbeloved, the butcher; and Peter, an old man who compulsively chops wood. After she discovers an infestation of mice at her house, the villagers suggest she seek out someone named Rob, who they tell her lives in the woods.

Norah finds "Rob," who turns out to be a young, handsome exterminator named Edgar, who spends his spare time practising karate nearly nude in the forest. Edgar successfully clears Norah's house of the mice. Although she finds him personally boring, Norah is nonetheless attracted to him. After an incident in which he kills a bird that someone drops down her chimney, Norah sleeps with him, despite having misplaced her diaphragm.

Soon after, Norah discovers that she's pregnant. She returns home to London for an abortion, but decides against the procedure at the last minute and goes back to the cabin. As Easter approaches, she discovers that she's slowly being cut off from the outside world: her phone lines are cut, her car is tampered with, and the local bus driver refuses to stop for her. Norah begins to believe that she's the victim of a village-wide conspiracy and that the village plans to sacrifice her and take her child.

Norah lets Edgar into her house, as he seems to be the only village person not involved in the conspiracy. While they discuss what's been happening, the villagers converge on the house in a lynch mob. Against her expectations, the villagers leave Norah alone, but Edgar is gone, apparently sacrificed.

Mr. Fisher explains that the nickname "Rob" came from "Robin" and that "Robin redbreast" is a special totem in the pagan religion of the town. Edgar/Robin was raised from birth by the townspeople with the purpose of becoming a sacrificial lamb. Fisher explains that Norah's child will be the next Robin, and offers to raise the child for her so that she can return to a normal life in London. Norah refuses, but is allowed to leave nonetheless. As she departs the village, she turns back for one last look and sees that the townspeople have all transformed into pagan deities led by Fisher as Herne the Hunter.

Cast
 Anna Cropper as Norah Palmer
 Julian Holloway as her friend Jake
 Amanda Walker as her friend Madge
 Freda Bamford as Mrs Vigo
 Bernard Hepton as Mr Fisher
 Andrew Bradford as Rob / Edgar
 Cyril Cross as Peter
 Robin Wentworth as Mr Wellbeloved

Production notes
Like other early episodes of Play for Today, although originally recorded on colour videotape, this programme only survives in the form of a 16mm black and white film recording. Colour recovery was not utilised for the BFI's DVD release of the play.

References

External links
 

1970 British television episodes
1970 television plays
British television plays
Play for Today